Mnesarchella vulcanica is a species of primitive moths in the family Mnesarchaeidae. This species is endemic to New Zealand and can be found in the Taranaki, Taupō, Gisborne and Rangitīkei regions. It very similar in appearance to others within its genus. This species is most easily confused with M. falcata.  M. vulcanica can only be distinguished by dissection and its differently shaped male genitalia. It lives in damp mountainous beech and podocarp forests at altitudes of between from 800–1400 m and is on the wing from December to February.

Taxonomy 

This species was first described by George William Gibbs in 2019. The male holotype specimen was collected by Gibbs on the Erua - Hauhungatahi track in the Tongariro National Park and is held in the New Zealand Arthropod Collection.

Description 
This species is very similar in appearance to others within its genus. The forewing of the male of the species measures between 4.3 and 4.9 mm where as the female measures 4.5 mm. Unlike some species in this genus the female is not noticeably paler than the male. This species is most easily confused with M. falcata.  M. vulcanica can only be distinguished by dissection and its differently shaped male genitalia. As at 2019, the larvae of this species is unknown.

Distribution 
This species is endemic to New Zealand. This species is found in the Taranaki, Taupō, Gisborne and Rangitīki regions.

Habitat 
This species lives in damp mountainous beech and podocarp forests at altitudes of between from 800–1400 m.

Behaviour 
This species is on the wing from December to February.

References

Moths described in 2019
Endemic fauna of New Zealand
Moths of New Zealand
Mnesarchaeoidea
Taxa named by George William Gibbs
Endemic moths of New Zealand